Kingfish may refer to:

Fish
 Argyrosomus japonicus or Japanese meagre (Australia)
 Opah or Lampris guttatus (United Kingdom)
 Kingcroaker or Menticirrhus spp.
 King mackerel or Scomberomorus cavalla
 Yellowtail amberjack or Seriola lalandi (Australia, New Zealand)
 Butterfly kingfish or Gasterochisma melampus (Australia, New Zealand)

Military
AS-6 Kingfish or Raduga KSR-5, an air-launched Soviet anti-ship and strike missile
Convair Kingfish, a reconnaissance aircraft designed for Project GUSTO
USS Kingfish, a Gato-class submarine of the United States Navy
Kingfish, a nuclear test of Operation Fishbowl

Music
 Christone "Kingfish" Ingram, American blues musician
 Kingfish (Christone Ingram album), his first album
 Ed Manion, nicknamed "Kingfish", American saxophonist, touring member of the E Street Band
 Kingfish (band), a San Francisco Bay Area rock band
 Kingfish (1976 album), their first album
 Kingfish (1985 album), their fourth album
 "Kingfish", a 1974 song from Good Old Boys (Randy Newman album)
 "Kingfish", a 2010 song by Patrice Bart-Williams from his album One

Sports
Kenosha Kingfish, a baseball team in Kenosha, Wisconsin
Baton Rouge Kingfish, a defunct minor league ice hockey team in Baton Rouge, Louisiana

Television and radio
 Kingfish: A Story of Huey P. Long, a 1995 TV movie
 Kingfish, a character in Amos 'n' Andy

Other uses
KingFish phone tracker, a product line of human-portable cellular telephone identification and tracking devices

People with the nickname
 Christone "Kingfish" Ingram (born 1999), American blues guitarist
 King Levinsky (1910–1991), American heavyweight boxer
 Huey Long (1893–1935), Louisiana governor and senator
 Kenny Washington (American football) (1918–1971)

See also
 Black kingfish
 Giant kingfish
Kingfisher (disambiguation)

Lists of people by nickname